The Metropolitan King County Council, the legislative body of King County, Washington, consists of nine members elected by district.  The Council adopts laws, sets policy, and holds final approval over the budget. Its current name and structure is the result of a merger of King County and the Municipality of Metropolitan Seattle, better known as Metro, which was a federated county-city structure responsible for water quality and public transportation.

Councilmembers 
As a result of a County Charter amendment passed by voters in the November 2008 elections, all elective offices of King County are officially nonpartisan; that being said, all current council members have made their party affiliations a matter of public record. 

District 1: Rod Dembowski (D) took office 2013
District 2: Girmay Zahilay (D) took office 2020
District 3: Sarah Perry (D) took office 2022
District 4: Jeanne Kohl-Welles (D) took office 2016
District 5: Dave Upthegrove (D) took office 2014
District 6: Claudia Balducci (D) took office 2016
District 7: Pete von Reichbauer (R) took office 1994
District 8: Joe McDermott (D) took office 2010
District 9: Reagan Dunn (R) took office 2005

Claudia Balducci was elected as the Council Chair in the first meeting of 2020 and will serve the one-year term alongside Vice Chairs Reagan Dunn and Joe McDermott.

Meetings 
The County Council meets weekly at 10:30 a.m. on Wednesdays. Meetings are held in the County Council chambers, Room 1001, on the tenth floor of the King County Courthouse located at 516 Third Avenue between James and Jefferson in downtown Seattle.

Structure 
Nine Councilmembers are elected by district to four-year terms. Councilmembers in even numbered districts are up for election in 2023, while Councilmembers in odd districts are up for election in 2025. Prior to 2009, councilmembers were elected on a partisan basis, and had to declare their political party unless they filed as an Independent. An independent candidate had to receive at least 20 percent of the vote in the primary election to qualify for the general election ballot. This changed upon the passage of Charter Amendment 8 by voters in 2008, which made all elections for county offices nonpartisan.

The Council uses its committee structure to consider the legislation before it. Ordinances and motions (policy statements) are assigned to a King County Council committee for consideration, and then are recommended to the full Council for action.  Each year, the Council reorganizes and elects a Chair and Vice Chair. In addition, the Council decides yearly on its committee structure and makeup. Currently there are nine standing policy committees and three regional committees. Members of the Seattle City Council and representatives from suburban cities and local sewer districts are also members of the regional committees. In addition, all nine members of the Council meet as a Committee of the Whole to discuss broad-reaching legislation and issues.

The King County Executive is not a member of the Council, and is a separately elected official. The Executive submits legislation to the Council for consideration. Each year in October, the Executive submits a proposed budget to the County Council for the operation of County government for the coming year. The Executive has veto power over ordinances passed by the Council.

Redistricting 
In the 2004 general election voters approved a charter amendment to reduce the size of the council from thirteen to nine, which went into effect January 1, 2006. With four fewer districts, the number of constituents per district rose from 138,000 residents to about 193,000.

Past Councilmembers

Notes

References

External links
King County Council

Council
King County, Washington
County government in Washington (state)